Tiffany Montague was the manager of Google’s space initiatives. Her official position at Google was Intergalactic Federation King Almighty and Commander of the Universe.

Early life
Montague grew up in the UK, travelling to the United States at age 16 to attend Smith College where she joined the Reserve Officers' Training Corps and Mensa.

Work
After graduation, Montague served with the United States Air Force where she "had a down-looking sensor" and was mentored by Pete Worden, the head of NASA Ames, and at the National Reconnaissance Office.

Montague joined Google as a project manager c2005 and left in 2013.

References

External links
Photo

                   

Google employees
Living people
Year of birth missing (living people)